Little Green Creek is a tributary of Green Creek in Columbia County, Pennsylvania, in the United States. At least two bridges have been built over the creek and at least one ridge and one hillside is in its vicinity.

Course
Little Green Creek begins in a valley in Greenwood Township, less than a mile south of the border between Greenwood Township and Jackson Township. It flows east for some distance, receiving an unnamed tributary, before gradually turning southeast and flowing alongside the Austin Trail. Over the next few miles, it gradually turns south-southeast and south before its valley becomes abruptly shallower. The creek continues flowing south-southeast, crossing Pennsylvania Route 254 and entering Rohrsburg. In Rohrsburg, it reaches its confluence with Green Creek within several hundred feet.

Geography and watershed
The August 19, 1890 Columbia/Luzerne County Tornado began in the vicinity of this area. There is also a ridge located to the west of the creek.

The creek is one of several in Columbia County to have a 100-year floodplain.

Both the source and the mouth of the creek are in the United States Geological Survey quadrangle of Benton. The Columbia County Natural Areas Inventory states that it is likely that "sensitive [biological] features" could be found along the creek.

History and etymology
In the 19th century, a school district and geographic district known as the Little Green Creek District was present in northern Greenwood Township. It was named for Little Green Creek, which flowed through the district. The musician and composer Otto Porter Ikeler grew up on a farm on the Austin Trail in the vicinity of the creek.

Little Green Creek was entered into the Geographic Names Information System on August 2, 1979. Its identifier in the Geographic Names Information System is 1179558.

A steel stringer bridge was built over Little Green Creek in 1910 and repaired in 1991. Another bridge, a concrete stringer bridge, was built over the creek in 1918. The bridges carry T-599 and T-580, respectively.

Little Green Creek is named for the fact that it is smaller than Green Creek, which it is a tributary of.

See also
Rickard Hollow, next tributary of Green Creek going downstream
List of tributaries of Fishing Creek (North Branch Susquehanna River)

References

Rivers of Columbia County, Pennsylvania
Tributaries of Fishing Creek (North Branch Susquehanna River)
Rivers of Pennsylvania